Miguel Brito  was a Bolivian football midfielder.

Career 
During his career he participated and made zero appearances for the Bolivia national team at the 1930 FIFA World Cup. 
His career in club football was spent in Oruro Royal

References

External links

Year of birth missing
Year of death missing
Association football midfielders
Bolivian footballers
Bolivia international footballers
1930 FIFA World Cup players